Laurenne Ross (born August 17, 1988) is a former World Cup alpine ski racer from the United States. She specialized in the speed events of downhill and super G.

Born in Edmonton, Alberta in Canada, Ross was on skis at age two at the Snow Valley ski hill, as her father was a former alpine racer.  The family moved to Klamath Falls, Oregon, when she was age 7 and Ross skied and raced at Mount Bachelor near Bend. She was selected to the U.S. Ski Team in 2006, and made her World Cup debut in December 2009. Ross was moved up to the World Cup team for the 2011 season and represented the U.S. at the 2011 World Championships, where she finished tenth in the women's downhill. Ross attained her first World Cup podium in March 2013, placing second in a downhill at Garmisch-Partenkirchen, Germany.

In the summer of 2013, Ross switched from Atomic to Völkl skis.

Ross divided her time between the professional ski circuit and the University of Oregon in Eugene, where she currently studies art.

World Cup results

Season standings

Standings through 3 February 2019
^ Only four World Cup starts during 2010 season, while on Nor-Am/European Cup circuit.

Top ten finishes
2 podiums (1 DH, 1 SG)

World Championship results

Olympic results

Video
 You Tube.com – Mt. Bachelor – Laurenne Ross – December 2011

References

External links

Laurenne Ross World Cup standings at the International Ski Federation

U.S. Ski Team – profile – Laurenne Ross

Mount Bachelor – U.S. Ski Team athletes – Laurenne Ross

1988 births
American female alpine skiers
Living people
People from Klamath Falls, Oregon
Sportspeople from Edmonton
Sportspeople from Oregon
Alpine skiers at the 2014 Winter Olympics
Alpine skiers at the 2018 Winter Olympics
Olympic alpine skiers of the United States
Canadian emigrants to the United States
21st-century American women